"I Thought It Was Over" is a song performed by British band the Feeling for their second studio album, Join with Us. The song was released as the album's lead single on 11 February 2008 and peaked at number 9 on the UK Singles Chart. According to the band's official website, the song is about a love affair taking place around the time of the fall of the Berlin Wall for many weeks surpasses.

The song's music video premiered on Channel 4 on 22 December 2007. The video features the band in a dilapidated building, where, according to drummer, Paul Stewart, "Things shake and electronics go weird, as if being visited by other-worldly beings."

Formats and track listing
CD single (Released 11 February 2008)
"I Thought It Was Over" – 3:32
"Don't Make It Easy" – 2:55
"Colombia" – 4:06
"I Thought It Was Over" (official music video)

7" green vinyl (Released 11 February 2008)
"I Thought It Was Over" – 3:32
"Colombia" – 4:06

Digital download (Released 1 February 2008)
"I Thought It Was Over" (radio edit) – 3:32

Digital remixes EP (Released 1 February 2008)
"I Thought It Was Over" (Tom Middleton Vocal remix) – 7:30
"I Thought It Was Over" (Tom Middleton Dub remix) – 8:08

Charts

Weekly charts

Year-end charts

References

2008 singles
The Feeling songs
2007 songs
Songs written by Dan Gillespie Sells
Songs written by Richard Jones (The Feeling)
Songs written by Kevin Jeremiah
Songs written by Ciaran Jeremiah
Songs written by Paul Stewart (musician)